Three ships of the British Royal Navy have borne the name HMS Zulu, after the African Zulu people:

 , a 1905 Tribal-class (or F-class) destroyer that served in World War I
 , launched in 1937, a 1936  destroyer that served in World War II
 , launched in 1962, a 

Royal Navy ship names